Fremont Canyon may refer to:

 A tributary of Santiago Creek in Orange County, California

 Fremont Canyon (Utah), and the upper part of Fremont Wash in Iron County, Utah

 Fremont Canyon (Natrona County, Wyoming), a Bureau of Land Management Back Country Byway
 Fremont Canyon Powerplant, at the Pathfinder Dam on the North Platte River, Wyoming

See also
 Fremont Cannon